Klisura Peak is a peak rising to approx. 600 m in Friesland Ridge, Tangra Mountains, eastern Livingston Island in the South Shetland Islands, Antarctica. The peak overlooks Macy Glacier to the northeast, east and southeast and was named after the Bulgarian town of Klisura.

Location

Maps
 L.L. Ivanov et al. Antarctica: Livingston Island and Greenwich Island, South Shetland Islands. Scale 1:100000 topographic map. Sofia: Antarctic Place-names Commission of Bulgaria, 2005.
 L.L. Ivanov. Antarctica: Livingston Island and Greenwich, Robert, Snow and Smith Islands. Scale 1:120000 topographic map.  Troyan: Manfred Wörner Foundation, 2009.

References
 Klisura Peak. SCAR Composite Antarctic Gazetteer
 Bulgarian Antarctic Gazetteer. Antarctic Place-names Commission. (details in Bulgarian, basic data in English)

External links
 Klisura Peak. Copernix satellite image

Tangra Mountains